Jesse O’Hara (born November 15, 1943) is a Republican member of the Montana Legislature.  In 2006 he was elected to House District, and served in the 2008, 2010, and 2012 terms as well. He reached term limit.18 which represents the Great Falls, Montana area. He was elected to the senate in 1978 He previously served in the Senate during the 1979 and 1981 legislative sessions. He served in a number is  special sessions during that time period as well. He was elected to the house in 1984.

References

Living people
1943 births
Republican Party members of the Montana House of Representatives
Politicians from Great Falls, Montana